Carlos Alveiro Rentería Cuesta (born 4 March 1986 in Quibdó, Chocó) is a Colombian footballer who plays as striker.

Club career
After a great season and scoring 10 goals in the Colombian league, he had many offers from big clubs in Colombia as well as the Swiss club Basel. Renteria chose Atlético Nacional because performing well there would get him future call ups to the National team, and better offers abroad. In 2009 was loaned back to Atlético Huila after an accident killed two Huila players.

Personal life
His brother, Wason is a professional footballer currently playing for Millonarios.

External links
 
 
 Atlético Nacional Official Website
 Carlos Rentería, goleador y figura de La Equidad

1986 births
Living people
People from Quibdó
Colombian footballers
Association football forwards
Categoría Primera A players
Real Cartagena footballers
Atlético Huila footballers
Atlético Nacional footballers
La Equidad footballers
Atlético Junior footballers
Patriotas Boyacá footballers
Colombia international footballers
Sportspeople from Chocó Department